Bertie Grounds (14 January 1878 – 21 July 1950) was an Australian cricketer. He played two first-class matches for New South Wales between 1903/04 and 1905/06.

See also
 List of New South Wales representative cricketers

References

External links
 

1878 births
1950 deaths
Australian cricketers
New South Wales cricketers
Cricketers from Sydney